Gibberula ventricosa is a species of sea snail, a marine gastropod mollusk, in the family Cystiscidae.

Distribution
This species occurs in Egyptian part of the Red Sea.

References

ventricosa
Gastropods described in 2017